Trufanov is a Russian masculine surname, its feminine counterpart is Trufanova. It may refer to
Nikolai Trufanov (1900-1982), Soviet Colonel General during World War II
Kuzma Trufanov (1901–1958), Soviet commander during World War II
Mikhail Trufanov (1921–1988), Russian painter
Sergei Trufanov (1880–1952), Russian priest
Viktor Trufanov (born 1952), Russian general, head of the Russian Coast Guard 

Russian-language surnames